The 2022 GT America Series will be the second season of the SRO Motorsports Group's GT America Series, an auto racing series for grand tourer cars. The races are contested with GT2-spec, GT3-spec and GT4-spec cars. The season will begin on April 15 at Sonoma and end on October 9 at Indianapolis.

Calendar
The preliminary calendar was released on September 4, 2021, featuring seven rounds. On October 10, 2021, the SRO announced that the round at Virginia International Raceway would be postponed one week to avoid a clash with the 2022 24 Hours of Le Mans. In December, the SRO announced an additional round to be run alongside the Grand Prix of St. Petersburg in February.

Entry list

Race results
Bold indicates overall winner

Championship standings
Scoring system
Championship points are awarded for the first ten positions in each race. Entries are required to complete 75% of the winning car's race distance in order to be classified and earn points.

Drivers' championships

SRO3

GT2

GT4

Notes:
  – Driver did not finish the race but was classified, as he completed more than 75% of the race distance.

Notes

References

External links

GT America Series
GT America Series